Uittenbogaard is a Dutch toponymic surname. The surname has at least 60 different spellings, including Uijt de Boogaardt, Uijttenboogaard, Uit den Bogaard, Uitenbogaart, Uittenbogerd, Uyttenboogaart, and Wtenbogaert. The modern Dutch spelling would be "uit de boomgaard', meaning "(out) from the orchard". The surname has a very high number of alternative forms. People with this surname or one of its variant spellings include:

Albert Uytenbogaardt (born 1930), South African football goalkeeper
Dirk Uittenbogaard (born 1990), Dutch rower
 (born 1930), Dutch film actress
Johannes Wtenbogaert (1557–1644), Dutch Remonstrant leader
 (1911–1993), Dutch children's book writer and photographer
 (1897–1964), Dutch chemist
Marthijn Uittenbogaard (born 1972), Dutch politician and pedophile
 (1933–1998), South African architect
Theo Uittenbogaard (born 1946), Dutch radio & TV-producer

See also
Van den Boogaard, Dutch surname with the same origin and meaning
Uytenbogaardtite, sulfide mineral named after the Dutch mineralogist Willem Uytenbogaardt (1918–2012)

References

Dutch-language surnames
Toponymic surnames
Surnames of Dutch origin